Tilky Montgomery Jones (born June 24, 1981) is an American singer and actor. He was a member of the band Take 5 from 1997 to 2001.

Life and career
Jones was born in Vero Beach, Florida. He pursued acting after the breakup of his band, Take 5. Between 2003 and 2007, he made three appearances on CW television series One Tree Hill, in three different roles. In 2010, it was announced that he would join the television pilot of Single Ladies, and played the role of K.C. in its 2011 season.

On January 13, 2011, it was confirmed that Jones would portray Logan Reed on the ABC Family original television series Pretty Little Liars.

Jones played Sean Butler, the love interest of Hayden Panettiere's character Juliette Barnes, on the ABC drama series Nashville in the first Season from 2012 to 2013.

Filmography

Films

Television

References

External links
 Tilky Montgomery Jones Official Website

1981 births
Male actors from Omaha, Nebraska
American male film actors
American male television actors
Living people
Musicians from Omaha, Nebraska
Male actors from Charleston, South Carolina
20th-century American male actors
American male child actors
21st-century American male actors
Musicians from Charleston, South Carolina